Anna-Kaisa Rantanen (born 10 February 1978) is a Finnish former football midfielder, who most recently played for Klepp IL of the Norwegian Toppserien.

Career 
Rantanen previously played for HJK Helsinki in the Naisten Liiga, Linköping FC, Djurgårdens IF and Jitex BK in the Swedish Damallsvenskan, and VfL Wolfsburg in the German Bundesliga.

She is a member of the Finnish national team since 1996, taking part in the 2005 and 2009 European Championships. She scored Finland's first goal in a final tournament. Rantanen announced her retirement from football in early 2014 after spending two seasons in Norway with Klepp. She later agreed to play on an informal basis for local minnows Randaberg IL.

Titles
 3 Finnish Leagues (1997, 1998, 2001)
 3 Finnish Cups (1994, 1998, 2002)
 1 Swedish Cup (2008)

References

1978 births
Living people
Finnish women's footballers
Expatriate women's footballers in Sweden
Expatriate women's footballers in Germany
Expatriate women's footballers in Norway
FIFA Century Club
Finland women's international footballers
Finnish expatriate footballers
Helsingin Jalkapalloklubi (women) players
Kansallinen Liiga players
Damallsvenskan players
Djurgårdens IF Fotboll (women) players
Linköpings FC players
Jitex BK players
VfL Wolfsburg (women) players
Finnish expatriate sportspeople in Norway
Toppserien players
Women's association football midfielders
Footballers from Turku